Sedenia xeroscopa is a moth in the family Crambidae. It is found in Australia, where it has been recorded from New South Wales.

The wingspan is 19–22 mm. The forewings are light ochreous-fuscous, darkest along the costa and hindmargin. There is an obscure, moderately straight dark fuscous line from the costa to the inner margin. There is a dull whitish spot on the costa and an obscure fuscous discal spot at the end of the cell. The hindwings are greyish with a fuscous discal spot and a gently curved fuscous line from the costa towards the inner margin.

References

Moths described in 1900
Spilomelinae